Phenacogrammus major is a species of fish in the African tetra family. It is found in  the Dja River, of the Sangha drainage, of the middle Congo River basin, and in the Nyong, Ntem and Sanaga river basins in Cameroon Africa.

References

Alestidae
Freshwater fish of Africa
Taxa named by George Albert Boulenger
Fish described in 1903